The Athletics competition at the 1987 Pan American Games was held in Indianapolis, United States. The events were competed at the IU Indianapolis Track and Soccer Stadium.

Medal summary

Men's events

Women's events

 Some sources erroneously state the winner of the women's marathon as María del Carmen Díaz (later a Pan American Games winner on the track) instead of the correct winner, María del Carmen Cárdenas.

Medal table

Participating nations

See also
1987 in athletics (track and field)

References
GBR Athletics

 
1987
Pan American Games
1987 Pan American Games
Events at the 1987 Pan American Games
Track and field in Indiana